"To Be With You Again" is a 1987 single by British band Level 42, from their album Running in the Family. The song was written by Mark King and Boon Gould, and was released as a single in other countries such as Australia, Germany, Italy, the Netherlands and others by the record label Polydor.

"To Be With You Again" is the third Running in the Family single, released at the peak of their career. The single was preceded by two other UK Top 10 singles for the band: "Lessons In Love" (#3) and "Running in the Family" (#6). The song also gained popularity in the Netherlands, peaking at #6 in the Dutch Top 40.

This song has one music video, directed by Peter Christopherson, released in the same year of 1987.

Also, before its final draft, the rough draft of the song was first titled Mother Nature Says and has different lyrics which can be found on YouTube .

Personnel
Mark King - Bass/Vocals
Mike Lindup - Keyboards/Vocals
R. "Boon" Gould - Guitars
Phil Gould - Drums

Charts

Weekly charts

Year-end charts

References

External links
 https://www.youtube.com/watch?v=naxQck7ziVg Mother Nature Says demo track

1987 singles
Level 42 songs
1987 songs
Songs written by Mark King (musician)
Songs written by Boon Gould
Polydor Records singles